
Gmina Suszec is a rural gmina (administrative district) in Pszczyna County, Silesian Voivodeship, in southern Poland.

The gmina contains part of the protected area called Rudy Landscape Park.

Villages
Gmina Suszec contains the villages and settlements of Kobielice, Kryry, Mizerów, Radostowice, Rudziczka, and Suszec.

Neighbouring gminas
Gmina Suszec is bordered by the towns of Orzesze and Żory, and by the gminas of Kobiór, Pawłowice and Pszczyna.

References

Suszec
Pszczyna County